Manuel Jorge Domínguez Diaz (born 8 December 1962) is a Spanish former professional road bicycle racer. He competed in the individual road race event at the 1984 Summer Olympics.

Major results

1982
 1st Stage 1 Vuelta Asturias
1983
 1st  Road race, National Junior Road Championships
1984
 1st Gran Premio della Liberazione
1985
 10th Road race, National Road Championships
1986
 1st Stage 2 Vuelta a España
 1st Stage 3 Vuelta a La Rioja
 3rd Road race, National Road Championships
 3rd Overall Vuelta a Castilla y León
1987
 1st Stage 7 Tour de France
 1st Stage 1 Tour of the Basque Country
 2nd Overall Vuelta a Castilla y León
1st Stages 3 & 8 
 3rd Road race, National Road Championships
1988
 1st Stage 1 Tour of the Basque Country
 1st Stage 2 Vuelta Asturias
 Vuelta a Castilla y León
1st Stages 2 & 4 
 Tour of Galicia
1st Stages 1 & 3 
 2nd Road race, National Road Championships
1989
 1st Gran Premio de Llodio
 Volta a Catalunya
1st  Points classification
1st Stage 6a
 1st Stage 5 Grand Prix du Midi Libre
 1st Stage 5 Vuelta Asturias
 1st Stage 6 Vuelta a Castilla y León
 4th Trofeo Masferrer
 8th Road race, National Road Championships
1991
 3rd Road race, National Road Championships
 4th Grand Prix Pino Cerami

References

External links 

1962 births
Living people
People from Laviana
Cyclists from Asturias
Spanish Tour de France stage winners
Cyclists at the 1984 Summer Olympics
Olympic cyclists of Spain
Spanish male cyclists